The ET-Plus Guardrail system is manufactured by Trinity Highway Products, based in Dallas, Texas. The ET-Plus was designed at the Texas A&M Transportation Institute and built by Trinity. The end terminal cap absorbs the impact of a crash. The wooden posts break and the guardrail collapses. The end terminal slides along, pushing the guardrail to the side. However, in 2005, Trinity made changes to the ET-Plus without reporting the changes. It was alleged that the Trinity design change caused it to malfunction. A lawsuit under the False Claims Act filed in 2012 against Trinity stated that these changes were causing damages to cars and drivers. Tests have shown that the guardrails act the way they should.

Overview
The end terminal cap had been first tested in 2005 and over 200 thousand have been used on United States highways. In 2005 and 2006, five crash tests were done showing the ET-Plus a failure by spearing a vehicle or flipping it. Trinity argued that the tests were on an experimental system, and that the guardrails on the roads are safe.

Joshua Harman, a Virginia guardrail engineer, was whistleblower in a federal suit which accused Trinity of failing to notify the Federal Highway Administration (FHWA) of a change of size of the end piece from five to four inches. The Federal Highway Administration requires that changes be reported immediately. The change from five inches to four allegedly saved the company $2 per end terminal. A federal jury found Trinity guilty of fraud by not reporting a change of one inch made to the ET-Plus end terminal. The lawsuit resulted in a fraud verdict $175 million, which would be tripled.

In November 2014, Trinity announced its plan to test highway guardrails. In December 2014, an FHWA commissioned peer review of the study "Relative Comparison on NCHRT 350 Accepted W-Beam Guardrail End Terminals" was conducted by the University of Alabama at Birmingham. The reviewers found the information presented to be either questionable or invalid due to assumptions made on the report. The FHWA collected measurements of more than 1,000 ET-Plus devices to ensure the sets were representative of actual guardrails in use. Tests were mandated by the Federal Highway Administration.
 
As of January 2015, 40 states had suspended the use of guardrails. States that have used the ET-Plus endcaps are eligible for federal reimbursements. The company did a series of eight crash tests which were released in February 2015. done by Southwest Research Institute in Texas. The tests have been conducted at the height of 31 inches to meet crash test criteria. The test results must be considered alongside data from actual crashes to come up with a comprehensive report.

The Nevada Department of Transportation (NDOT) has removed the end terminal model, ET-Plus, from its list of approved products. Trinity has stopped the sale of the units until testing is completed.

The U.S. Justice Department launched a criminal investigation into the use of the guardrail system. The federal cases accuse Trinity of making false and misleading statements about the ET-Plus system.

In June 2015, a US district court jury verdict of $663 million was passed against Trinity Industries for defrauding the Federal Highway Administration. The original penalty of $175 million was tripled to $525 million, and an additional $8,250 was charged for each of the 16,771 false certification claims made by Trinity. Joshua Harmon, the whistleblower for the case, was awarded more than $16 million in legal fees and $2.3 million in expenses. Harmon was also awarded $199 million, thirty percent of the $663 million judgement. In September 2017, the United States Court of Appeals for the Fifth Circuit, in an opinion authored by Judge Patrick Higginbotham, reversed the finding of the district court and rendered judgement as a matter of law for Trinity.

References

Transport infrastructure
Road safety